Doba Arab (also Romanized as Dobā ʿArab; also known as Dowbbā ‘Arab) is a village in Vardasht Rural District, in the Central District of Semirom County, Isfahan Province, Iran. At the 2006 census, its population was 22, in 4 families.

References 

Populated places in Semirom County